Evan L. Morris (January 26, 1977 – July 9, 2015) was a lobbyist for Genentech and its parent corporation Roche in Washington, D.C.  He began his career in Washington as an intern in the Clinton White House at age 18. He began his lobbying work at Patton Boggs before moving on to Roche in 2005. His early work at Roche involved government policy on Medicare and Medicaid, flu preparedness, and hepatitis C.

His work at Genentech is being investigated by The Wall Street Journal, which states that "shaping up to be one of the biggest U.S. investigations into Washington's influence business since the bribery and corruption case surrounding lobbyist Jack Abramoff rocked the nation's capital in the mid-2000s."

He was a graduate of George Washington University Law School and Union College.

He committed suicide on July 9, 2015, age 38.

References

Further reading

External links

1947 Meet the Press Podcast - Chuck Todd and Brody Mullins (February 16, 2017). "The Lobbyist Who Flew Too Close to the Sun."

American lobbyists
1977 births
2015 deaths
George Washington University Law School alumni
Lawyers from Washington, D.C.
Suicides by firearm in Virginia
Genentech people
2015 suicides